The Touchard polynomials, studied by , also called the exponential polynomials or Bell polynomials, comprise a polynomial sequence of binomial type defined by

where is a Stirling number of the second kind, i.e., the number of partitions of a set of size n into k disjoint non-empty subsets.

Properties

Basic properties 
The value at 1 of the nth Touchard polynomial is the nth Bell number, i.e., the number of partitions of a set of size n:

If X is a random variable with a Poisson distribution with expected value λ, then its nth moment is E(Xn) = Tn(λ), leading to the definition:

Using this fact one can quickly prove that this polynomial sequence is of binomial type, i.e., it satisfies the sequence of identities:

The Touchard polynomials constitute the only polynomial sequence of binomial type with the coefficient of x equal 1 in every polynomial.

The Touchard polynomials satisfy the Rodrigues-like formula:

The Touchard polynomials satisfy the recurrence relation

and

In the case x = 1, this reduces to the recurrence formula for the Bell numbers.

Using the umbral notation Tn(x)=Tn(x), these formulas become:

The generating function of the Touchard polynomials is

which corresponds to the generating function of Stirling numbers of the second kind.

Touchard polynomials have contour integral representation:

Zeroes 

All zeroes of the Touchard polynomials are real and negative. This fact was observed by L. H. Harper in 1967. 

The absolute value of the leftmost zero is bounded from above by

although it is conjectured that the leftmost zero grows linearly with the index n.

The Mahler measure of the Touchard polynomials can be estimated as follows:

 and 
are maximal, respectively.

Generalizations 
 Complete Bell polynomial  may be viewed as a multivariate generalization of Touchard polynomial , since 
 The Touchard polynomials (and thereby the Bell numbers) can be generalized, using the real part of the above integral, to non-integer order:

See also 
 Bell polynomials

References

Polynomials